Tha Chalom is a historic tambon (sub-district) of Mueang Samut Sakhon District, Samut Sakhon Province, central Thailand. Its name is also a name of surrounding area.

History
Tha Chalom has a history that goes back to the middle Ayutthaya period during the reign of King Maha Chakkraphat when he established Ban Tha Chin (บ้านท่าจีน) as a town in those days. Tha Chalom and Mahachai at that time were communities of the Chinese people, there are many Chinese piers along both banks of Tha Chin River. Hence, the river named Tha Chin, which means "Chinese pier". 

Tha Chalom is regarded as the first sukhaphiban (sanitary district) in Thailand. It was founded by King Chulalongkorn (Rama V) in 1905 after he saw the filth of Nakhon Khuan Khan (now Phra Pradaeng District, Samut Prakan Province) and compare that "dirty as Mahachai market". So Ministry of Interior by Prince Damrong Rajanubhab cleaned up the town and built new roads for the King. One of them when complete the King presided over the official road opening ceremony on March 18, 1905 and named it "Thawai Road" (offer road). 

The name "Tha Chalom" means "pier of Chalom" (Chalom is a type of Thai vendor boat similar to junk).

Tha Chalom in the reign of King Chulalongkorn was the capital of the province and more prosperous than Mahachai side.

Geography
Tha Chalom is the central west area of Mueang Samut Sakhon District. Its terrain is the pig stomach-shaped of land formed by a sharp meander in Tha Chin River. Across the river is Samut Sakhon core or familiarly known as Mahachai.

Tha Chalom is bounded by other areas (from north clockwise): Mahachai and Bang Ya Praek in its district, Tha Chin in its district, Bay of Bangkok (upper Gulf of Thailand), Krokkrak in its district, respectively.

The main watercourse of Samut Sakhon, Tha Chin River that originated in Chainat Province flows into the Gulf of Thailand here.

Administration
Tha Chalom is a part of administrative area of Thesaban Nakhon Samut Sakhon (Samut Sakhon Municipality).

Transportation
Presently, Tha Chalom residents still preserve their traditional way of life, old buildings with chic graffiti can still be seen on the streets. Pedicabs serve the area.

Tha Chalom is also home to Ban Laem Railway Station, origin of Maeklong Railway (second section) with the starting point at Wongwian Yai in Bangkok and terminated at Samut Songkhram Province.

Traveling between Tha Chalom and Mahachai must rely mainly on the Tha Chin River Ferry.

Economy
Most locals work in fisheries. Miniature fishing boat models and dried seafood are local products.

Places
Tha Chalom Ferry Pier
Ban Laem Railway Station
Tha Chalom Railway Halt
Wat Laem Suwannaram
Wat Sutthiwat Wararam (Wat Chong Lom)
Guanyin Shrine
St Anne Church

Popular culture
Tha Chalom is the setting of a Thai luk krung song, titled 'Tha Chalom'. It was sung by Charin Nuntanakorn in the year 1961.

References

Historic districts in Thailand
Tambon of Samut Sakhon Province